Declan Christopher John (born 30 June 1995) is a Welsh professional footballer who plays as a left wing-back for Bolton Wanderers and the Wales national team.

Club career

Cardiff City

Born in Merthyr Tydfil, John progressed through the academy at Cardiff City. His professional debut for Cardiff came on 14 August 2012, in a 2–1 home defeat to Northampton Town in the first round of the Football League Cup. On 5 January 2013, he made his only other appearance of the season, a loss by the same margin at Macclesfield Town in the third round of the FA Cup.

John made his league debut on 17 August 2013 in a 2–0 loss at West Ham United, Cardiff's first game in the Premier League. He signed a long-term contract until 2018 in December. He went on to make 20 appearances that season, appearing more frequently in the second half of the campaign, as the Bluebirds were relegated.

Under new manager, Russell Slade, John fell down the pecking order and was subsequently loaned out to Barnsley for the remainder of the season. He made nine appearances for the Tykes before returning to Cardiff at the end of the season.

After only making a single appearance for Cardiff during the 2015–16 season, John signed for League One side Chesterfield on a month-loan deal in February, where he impressed in six appearances before being recalled by Cardiff on 14 April.

Upon his return to Cardiff, John impressed new manager, Paul Trollope, during pre-season and went on to make his first league start for the club in over a year, where he put in a man of the match performance in a goalless draw against Birmingham City on the opening day of the season. Despite an impressive start to the season, John became a bit-part player under Neil Warnock and was told he could leave the club at the end of the season.

Rangers
John was loaned to Scottish Premiership club Rangers in August 2017, and the move was made permanent in December.

Swansea City
On 9 August 2018, John joined Swansea City on a three-year contract. He made his debut for Swansea on 28 August 2018 in the EFL Cup against Crystal Palace.

John signed for Sunderland on a six-month loan on 31 January 2020. He played no matches, and returned to Swansea after the completion of his loan. On 7 January 2021, John joined League Two side Bolton Wanderers on loan for the remainder of the 2020–21 season.

Bolton Wanderers
On 11 June 2021, Bolton confirmed that John would be re-joining them on a permanent three year deal. John made his second debut for the club on 7 August in a 3–3 draw against MK Dons

International career
John was first called up to the Wales squad for the 2014 FIFA World Cup qualifiers against Macedonia and Serbia, in September 2013. He was an unused substitute in both games. The following month, he retained his place in the squad for the qualifiers against Macedonia and Belgium. On 11 October, John made his debut, playing the whole 90 minutes in the 1–0 win against Macedonia at the Cardiff City Stadium.

Career statistics

Club

International

Honours
Bolton Wanderers
EFL League Two third-place (promotion): 2020–21

References

External links

Wales profile at UEFA

1995 births
Living people
Footballers from Merthyr Tydfil
Welsh footballers
Wales youth international footballers
Wales under-21 international footballers
Wales international footballers
Association football fullbacks
Cardiff City F.C. players
Barnsley F.C. players
Chesterfield F.C. players
Premier League players
English Football League players
Rangers F.C. players
Scottish Professional Football League players
Swansea City A.F.C. players
Sunderland A.F.C. players
Bolton Wanderers F.C. players